Albert Richard West (7 November 1920 – 8 June 1985) was an English cricketer. West was a left-handed batsman who bowled slow left-arm orthodox. He was born at Earl Shilton, Leicestershire.

West made his first-class debut for Leicestershire against Oxford University in 1939 at the University Parks. He made two further first-class appearances for Leicestershire in the 1939 County Championship, against Hampshire at the County Ground, Southampton, and Sussex at the Central Recreation Ground, Hastings. He scored 50 runs in his three first-class appearances, which came at an average of 10.00, with a high score of 22. With the ball, he took 2 wickets at an expensive bowling average of 102.50, with best figures of 2/46.

He died at the place of his birth on 8 June 1985.

References

External links
Richard West at ESPNcricinfo
Richard West at CricketArchive

1920 births
1985 deaths
People from Earl Shilton
Cricketers from Leicestershire
English cricketers
Leicestershire cricketers